Killingholme railway station was located on Killingholme Marsh in the parish of South Killingholme, Lincolnshire, England, equidistant from the villages of North and South Killingholme.

The station was built by the Barton and Immingham Light Railway under the auspices of the Great Central Railway. The line's primary purpose was to enable workers to get to and from Immingham Dock which was being built at the time the line was opened. The typical journey time to the dock was six minutes.

The station had a single straight wooden platform bearing a small wooden station building with minimal facilities. Early maps show that the station was situated on a passing loop, but no second platform was ever built.

When the line and station were built the area was rural and very thinly populated. By 2015 the area had become industrial but remained thinly populated. A single track still ran through the site, now carrying modern produce.

On 7 October 1967 a RCTS railtour passed through the station.

References

Sources

External links
 Railtour visit 6 October 1967 Six Bells Junction
 Services from New Holland Disused Stations UK
 The station on a 1930 OS map National Library of Scotland
 The station on a 1948 OS map npe maps
 The station Rail Map Online
 The station and section of line railwaycodes

Disused railway stations in the Borough of North Lincolnshire
Former Great Central Railway stations
Railway stations in Great Britain opened in 1911
Railway stations in Great Britain closed in 1963